Newbridge RFC is a Welsh Rugby Union club based in Newbridge, Caerphilly in South Wales. Newbridge RFC was formed in 1888 and joined the WRU in 1911. They play in the WRU Specsavers Division 1 East

Club history
Newbridge RFC established in 1888, but only gained admission to the WRU in 1911 when it secured a ground and facilities up to WRU requirements.

In 1925 Newbridge Rugby Club moved to their present home at the Welfare Ground where they signed a 99-year lease at a shilling a year. A new pavilion had been constructed around this time and the club now shares their ground with the local cricket team. The club are presently in their third clubhouse at the site after an explosion and 2 fires caused damage to past buildings.

On the field, Newbridge have been pioneers of a number of well known rugby traits, most of which were brought to fruition by the pioneering coach Dai Harries during his tenure as Club Coach in the 1960s. Most recognisably, these are; the tap signal from the hooker to the scrum half to feed the scrum, the formation of a wall for the taking of penalties and we are also one of the first Club's to introduce the Hooker as the player to throw the ball into the lineout. It was during Dai's reign as coach that the Club enjoyed its most successful period as in the 1964/65 season, the team captured the Western Mail Championship to be crowned Champions of Wales.

British and Irish Lions 
The following players have played for the British and Irish Lions while playing for Newbridge RFC.
  Don Hayward

International honours 
The following players have been capped at international level while playing for Newbridge RFC.
See also :Category:Newbridge RFC players
  Billy Gore
  Ken Braddock
  Ray Cale (4 caps)
  Clive Davis
  Kenny Waters
  Andy Allen
  Don Hayward
  Dennis Hughes
  Terry Shaw
  Paul Turner
  Andrew Gibbs

Club honours
 Western Mail Championship 1964–65 – Champions
 Snelling Sevens 1990 – Champions
 Snelling Sevens 1992 – Champions
 Ben Francis Cup 2010 and 2011 Winners

Games played against international opposition

1 A joint Pontypool/Newbridge team.
2 A joint Ebbw Vale /Newbridge team.
3 A joint Abertillery/Newbridge team.
4 A joint Pontypool/Cross Keys/Newbridge team.

References

Welsh rugby union teams
1888 establishments in Wales
Rugby clubs established in 1888
Sport in Caerphilly County Borough